"The Downfall of Paris" is a British traditional tune. It dates back to the Napoleonic Wars, and became a popular marching song amongst British troops fighting in the Peninsular War. Its tune is partly a reworking of the French song "Ça Ira". It emerged when British war fortunes were at a low ebb in the early 1800s, partly as a song of defiance. It was played in Egypt in 1801 when British troops took Alexandria from French occupying forces. When British troops entered Paris in 1815 following the victory at Waterloo, a regimental band struck up the tune only to be rebuked by Wellington who didn't wish to offend the inhabitants. Nonetheless, the bands of Britain's allies Prussia, Austria and Russia all played the tune as they paraded in occupied Paris. The tune has spread into both American and Irish folk music. The Irish band The Dubliners recorded a version in 1975 on their album Now.

References

Bibliography
 Mackesy, Piers. British Victory in Egypt, 1801: The End of Napoleon's Conquest. Routledge, 2013.
 Muir, Rory. Salamanca 1812. Yale University Press, 2001.
 Richards, Donald Sydney. The Peninsula Veterans. Macdonald and Jane's, 1975.

British songs
Year of song unknown
19th-century songs
Songwriter unknown